Sir Ashutosh Mukherjee  (anglicised, originally Asutosh Mukhopadhyay, also anglicised to Asutosh Mookerjee) (29 June 1864 – 25 May 1924) was a prolific Bengali educator, jurist, barrister and mathematician. He was the first student to be awarded a dual degree (MA in Mathematics and MSc in Physics) from Calcutta University. Perhaps the most emphatic figure of Indian education, he was a man of great personality, high self-respect, courage and towering administrative ability. The second Indian Vice-Chancellor of the University of Calcutta for four consecutive two-year terms (1906–1914) and a fifth two-year term (1921–23), Mukherjee was responsible for the foundation of the Bengal Technical Institute in 1906, which was later known as Jadavpur University and the University College of Science (Rajabazar Science College) of the Calcutta University in 1914.

Mukherjee also played a vital role in the founding of the University College of Law popularly known as Hazra Law College. The Calcutta Mathematical Society was also founded by Mukherjee in 1908 and he served as the president of the Society from 1908 to 1923. He was also the president of the inaugural session of the Indian Science Congress in 1914 held at the Rajabazar Science College, which he founded. The Ashutosh College was also founded under his stewardship in 1916, when he was Vice-chancellor of University of Calcutta.

He was often called "Banglar Bagh" ('The Bengal Tiger') for his high self-esteem, courage and academic integrity.According to historian D. R. Bhandarkar, the epithet 'Vikramaditya' is also ascribed to Sir Ashutosh Mukherjee.

Early life
Ashutosh Mukherjee was born on 29 June 1864 at Bowbazar, Kolkata in a Brahmin family to Jagattarini Devi and Ganga Prasad Mukhopadhyaya, a well-known doctor who founded the South Sub Urban School in Calcutta. Among his ancestors were several distinguished Sanskrit scholars, including Pandit Ramchandra Tarkalankar, a professor of nyaya who had been appointed by Warren Hastings to that chair at the Sanskrit College in Kolkata. Brought up in an atmosphere of science and literature at home, young Ashutosh went to the Sisu Vidayalaya at Chakraberia, Bhowanipore and showed an early aptitude for mathematics. When he was young, he met Ishwar Chandra Vidyasagar who was a major influence on him. He was a student of Madhusudan Das.

Personal life
Mukherjee married Jogamaya Devi Bhattacharyya (1871–16 July 1958) in 1885. The couple had seven children, Kamala (born 1895), Rama Prasad (1896-1983), Syama Prasad (1901-1953), Uma Prasad (1902-1997), Amala (born 1905), Bama Prasad (born 1906) and Ramala (born 1908). His son Syama Prasad Mookerjee, the most notable of his children, founded the Bharatiya Jana Sangh, the direct precursor to the modern Bharatiya Janata Party. Rama Prasad became a judge in the High Court of Calcutta while Uma Prasad became famed as a Himalayan trekker and a travel writer - being awarded the Sahitya Akademi Award for his travelogue Manimahesh. His grandson Chittatosh Mookerjee was the Chief Justice of the Calcutta High Court.

Family history 
Sir Ashutosh Mukherjee was born into a Hindu Brahmin family in Kolkata, West Bengal. His ancestral town was Jirat in Hooghly District, West Bengal. His grandfather actually came to Jirat from another village named Digsui, situated also in the Hooghly District and settled down there. Sir Ashutosh's father Ganga Prasad Mukherjee was born in Jirat, Hooghly District on 16 December 1836. He was a very meritorious student and he came to Kolkata to study in Medical College with the help of the wealthy people of Jirat. Later he settled down in Bhawanipore area of Kolkata.

Accomplishments as a mathematician
In November 1879, at the age of fifteen, Mukherjee passed the entrance exam of the Calcutta University in which he stood second and received a first grade scholarship. In the year 1880, he took admission at the Presidency College now (Presidency University) in Kolkata where he met P.C. Ray and Narendranath Dutta who would later become famous as Swami Vivekananda. Later that year, though only a first-year undergraduate, he published his first mathematical paper, on a new proof of the 25th proposition of Euclid's first book.

In 1883, Mukherjee topped the BA examination at Calcutta University to complete a postgraduate degree in mathematics. In 1883 S.N. Banerjee wrote an article in the newspaper Bengalee against the orders of the Calcutta High Court and he was arrested in contempt of court. Protests and hartals erupted across Bengal and other cities, led by a group of students headed by Mukherjee at Calcutta high court. In 1884, he won the Harishchandra Prize for academic achievements, and completed an M.A. with first-class honours in mathematics in 1885. In 1886, he was awarded a second Masters in Natural Sciences, making him the first student to be awarded a dual degree from Calcutta University. In the same year he was married to Jogomaya Devi, and also published his third mathematical paper, "A Note on Elliptic Functions." The paper was praised by the distinguished British mathematician and Fellow of the Royal Society Arthur Cayley as a contribution of "outstanding merit." Mukherjee was recognised for his achievements by the grant of the Premchand Roychand Fellowship in Mathematics and Physics, Pure and Applied. Still only aged 22, he was further recognised by his election as a Fellow of the Royal Society of Edinburgh (FRSE). By 1888, Mukherjee was a lecturer in mathematics for the recently established Indian Association for the Cultivation of Science (IACS).

Mukherjee continued publishing scholarly papers on mathematics and physics into his 30s. By 1893, aged 29, Mukherjee had been further elected to the fellowships of the Physical Society of France and the Mathematical Society of Palermo, and was a member of the Royal Irish Academy. He subsequently became a member of the London Mathematical Society, the Paris Mathematical Society and the American Mathematical Society (1900). Although after 1893 he largely abandoned his mathematical pursuits for a legal career, Mukherjee has been recognised as the first modern Indian mathematician to enter the field of mathematical research, and founded the Calcutta Mathematical Society in 1908. Among his mathematical contributions, Mukherjee determined several crucial derivations of Gaspare Mainardi's answer to determining the oblique trajectory of a system of confocal ellipses. He also made lasting contributions in differential geometry, developing analytical methods of simplifying Gaspard Monge's interpretation of his general differential equation for conics.

Lawyer, jurist and educationist

At the age of 24, Mukherjee became a Fellow of the Calcutta University. Turning down a job offer in the Department of Public Instruction in order to complete his Bachelor of Law degree, he received his degree in 1888 and enrolled as a vakil of the Calcutta High Court. By 1897, he had received an LL.D. and was appointed the Tagore Professor of Law of the Calcutta University in that year. In 1904, he was appointed a puisne judge of the High Court, and subsequently served as its acting Chief Justice for a couple of years.

Mukherjee was influential in the University affairs throughout his life. From the age of 25, he was a member of its Syndicate, serving on the University Senate and Syndicate for the next 16 years. He served as President of the Board of Studies in Mathematics for 11 years, and represented his university in the Bengal Legislative Council from 1899 to 1903. He was appointed Vice-Chancellor from 1906 to 1914 and again from 1921 to 1923.  He was instrumental in discovering the talents of C. V. Raman and S. Radhakrishnan.The French scholar Sylvain Lévi commented :

Academic career and later life
Ashutosh Mukherjee had a vision of the kind of education he wanted young people to have, and he had the acumen and courage to extract it from his colonial masters. He set up several new academic graduate programs at the Calcutta University: comparative literature, anthropology, applied psychology, industrial chemistry, ancient Indian history and culture as well as Islamic culture. He also made arrangements for postgraduate teaching and research in Bengali, Hindi, Pali and Sanskrit. Scholars from all over India, irrespective of race, caste, and gender, came to study and teach there. He even persuaded European scholars to teach at his university. He was one of the first persons to recognise the work of Srinivasa Ramanujan. He also established Asutosh College in South Kolkata in 1916. He laid the foundry stone of Jagadbandhu Institution in 1914 and Santragachi Kedarnath Institution in 1925.

Curzon's education mission in 1902 identified the universities including the Calcutta University, as centres of sedition where young people formed networks of resistance to colonial domination. The cause of this was thought to be the unwise granting of autonomy to these universities in the nineteenth century. Thus in the period of 1905 to 1935, the colonial administration tried to reinstate government control of education.

In 1910, he was appointed the President of the Imperial (now National) Library Council to which he donated his personal collection of 80,000 books which are arranged in a separate section. He was the president of the inaugural session of the Indian Science Congress in 1914. Mukherjee was a member of the 1917–1919 Sadler Commission, presided over by Michael Ernest Sadler, which inquired into the state of Indian education. He was thrice elected as the president of The Asiatic Society. Having served as a fellow and subsequently as a vice-president of the Indian Association for the Cultivation of Science since the 1890s, in 1922 he was elected President of the IACS and held the office until his death.

After serving five terms as Vice-Chancellor of Calcutta University, Mukherjee declined to be reappointed to a sixth term in 1923 when the university's Chancellor, Governor of Bengal the Earl of Lytton, tried to impose conditions on his reappointment. Shortly thereafter, he also resigned his judgeship on the Calcutta High Court and resumed his private practice of law. While arguing a case in Patna the following year, Mukherjee died suddenly on 25 May 1924, a month before his sixtieth birthday. His body was returned to Kolkata and cremated at a funeral service which drew crowds of mourners.

Recognition and legacy

Mukherjee was a polyglot learned in Pali, French and Russian. Apart from his fellowships and memberships in several international academic bodies, he was recognised by an award of the title of Saraswati in 1910 from pandits in Nabadwip, followed by that of Shastravachaspati in 1912 from the Dhaka Saraswat Samaj, Sambudhagama Chakravarty in 1914 and Bharat Martanda in 1920. Mukherjee was appointed a Companion of the Order of the Star of India (CSI) in June 1909, and knighted in December 1911.

In his lifetime, he was appointed to numerous academic societies:
Fellow of the Royal Astronomical Society (FRAS, 1885)
Fellow of the Royal Society of Edinburgh (FRSE, 1886; Member: 1885)
Member of the Bedford Association for the Improvement of Geometrical Teaching (1886)
Fellow of the Physical Society of London (FPSL, 1887)
Fellow of the Edinburgh Mathematical Society (1888)
Membre de la Société mathématique de France (1888)
Member of the Circolo Matematico di Palermo (1890)
Membre de la Société française de physique (1890)
Member of the Royal Irish Academy (MRIA, 1893)
Fellow of the American Mathematical Society (AMS, 1900)

The Government of India issued a stamp in 1964 to commemorate Sir Ashutosh Mukherjee for his contribution to education.

The epitaph beneath his marble bust at the Ashutosh Museum of Arts at the University of Calcutta reads:

References

1864 births
1924 deaths
Bengali Hindus
Bengali scientists
20th-century Bengalis
19th-century Bengalis
Presidency University, Kolkata alumni
University of Calcutta alumni
Bengali mathematicians
Brahmos
Scholars from Kolkata
Fellows of learned societies of India
Indian mathematicians
19th-century Indian mathematicians
Indian educational theorists
20th-century Indian mathematicians
20th-century Indian educational theorists
Knights Bachelor
Companions of the Order of the Star of India
Indian Knights Bachelor
Vice Chancellors of the University of Calcutta
Founders of Indian schools and colleges
Indian lawyers
19th-century Indian lawyers
20th-century Indian lawyers
Indian barristers
Presidents of The Asiatic Society
Fellows of the Royal Society of Edinburgh
Members of the Royal Irish Academy
Academic staff of the University of Calcutta
Educationists from India
Indian academics
West Bengal academics
Indian scientists
Indian scholars
19th-century Indian scholars
20th-century Indian scholars
Heads of universities and colleges in India
Indian academic administrators
Indian educators
20th-century Indian educators
19th-century Indian educators
Educators from West Bengal
Indian jurists
Judges of the Calcutta High Court
Indian lecturers
Linguists from Bengal
20th-century Indian linguists
19th-century Indian linguists